Diopatra is a genus of polychaete worms in the family Onuphidae.

Description
Members of this genus live in thick, parchment-like tubes that project from the sediment on the seabed. The tubes are covered on the outside by fragments of shell, algae, fibers and other small objects, collected by the worm and stuck in place by mucus.
The worm's tube is a food-catching tool that creates a small micro-reef where small invertebrate prey reside.  Diopatra dart partially out of the tube and grasp the prey with their maxillae and mandibles. Their large anterior parapodia help them to immobilize the prey.

Species
The World Register of Marine Species includes these species in the genus.
A 2021 study also identified 4 new species in the south-west Atlantic.

Diopatra aciculata Knox & Cameron, 1971
Diopatra agave Grube, 1869
Diopatra akarana Knox & Hicks, 1973
Diopatra albimandibulata Paxton, 1993
Diopatra amboinensis Audouin & Milne Edwards, 1833
Diopatra amoena Kinberg, 1865
Diopatra angolensis Kirkegaard, 1988
Diopatra bengalensis Hartman, 1974
Diopatra bilobata Imajima, 1967
Diopatra brasiliensis Kinberg, 1910
Diopatra brevicirris Grube, 1856
Diopatra bulohensis Tan & Chou, 1996
Diopatra chiliensis Quatrefages, 1866
Diopatra chiliensis Quatrefages, 1865
Diopatra claparedii Grube, 1878
Diopatra cuprea (Bosc, 1802)
Diopatra dentata Kinberg, 1865
Diopatra denticulata Fauchald, 1968
Diopatra dexiognatha Paxton & Bailey-Brock, 1986
Diopatra dubia Day, 1960
Diopatra farallonensis Fauchald, 1968
Diopatra gesae Paxton, 1998
Diopatra gigova Paxton, 1993
Diopatra hanleyi Paxton, 1993
Diopatra hannelorae Steiner & Amaral sp. nov.
Diopatra heterodentata Hartmann-Schröder, 1965
Diopatra italica Castelnau, 1842
Diopatra khargiana Wesenberg-Lund, 1949
Diopatra kristiani Paxton, 1998
Diopatra leuckarti Kinberg, 1865
Diopatra lilliputiana Paxton, 1993
Diopatra longicornis Kinberg, 1865
Diopatra longissima Grube, 1850
Diopatra maculata Paxton, 1993
Diopatra madeirensis Langerhans, 1880
Diopatra malabarensis Quatrefages, 1866
Diopatra marinae Steiner & Amaral sp. nov.
Diopatra marocensis Paxton, Fadlaoui & Lechapt, 1995
Diopatra micrura Pires, Paxton, Quintino & Rodrigues, 2010
Diopatra monroi Day, 1960
Diopatra monroviensis Augener, 1918
Diopatra musseraensis Augener, 1918
Diopatra neapolitana Delle Chiaje, 1841
Diopatra neotridens Hartman, 1944
Diopatra obliqua Hartman, 1944
Diopatra oligopectinata Paxton, 1993
Diopatra ornata Moore, 1911
Diopatra papillata Fauchald, 1968
Diopatra paradoxa Quatrefages, 1866
Diopatra pectiniconicum Steiner & Amaral sp. nov.
Diopatra rhizoicola Hartmann-Schröder, 1960
Diopatra rhizophorae Grube, 1856
Diopatra semperi Grube, 1878
Diopatra splendidissima Kinberg, 1865
Diopatra sugokai Izuka, 1907
Diopatra tridentata Hartman, 1944
Diopatra uncinifera Quatrefages, 1866
Diopatra variabilis Southern, 1921
Diopatra victoriae Steiner & Amaral sp. nov.
Diopatra viridis Kinberg, 1865

References

Errantia